Stellaria gigantea is a species of large sea snail, a marine gastropod mollusk in the family Xenophoridae, the carrier shells.

Description

Distribution

References

 Kilburn R.N. (1973). Notes on some benthic Mollusca from Natal and Moçabique, with descriptions of new species and subspecies of Calliostoma, Solariella, Latiaxis, Babylonia, Fusinus, Bathytoma and Conus. Annals of the Natal Museum 21(3):557-578.
 Kreipl K. & Alf A. (1999). Recent Xenophoridae. Conchbooks, Hackenheim > Germany. 148pp.

Xenophoridae
Gastropods described in 1909